Rudolf 'Rolf' Schafstall (22 February 1937 – 30 January 2018) was a German football coach and a player. He was born in Duisburg, Germany.

Schafstall died on 30 January 2018 in Krefeld, Germany at the age of 80.

References

1937 births
2018 deaths
German footballers
Footballers from Duisburg
Association football midfielders
SSV Reutlingen 05 players
German football managers
MSV Duisburg managers
Karlsruher SC managers
VfL Bochum managers
FC Schalke 04 managers
KFC Uerdingen 05 managers
VfL Osnabrück managers
Stuttgarter Kickers managers
Fortuna Düsseldorf managers
Hannover 96 managers
Dynamo Dresden managers
Bundesliga managers
Rot-Weiss Essen managers
West German footballers
West German football managers